Stocqueler is a surname. People with that name include:

 Edwin Roper Loftus Stocqueler (1829-1895), British artist
 Joachim Hayward Stocqueler (1801-1886), British journalist, author and lecturer with interests in the theatre and in Indian and military affairs
 Giovanna Sestini (married name Joanna Stocqueler, 1749-1814), Italian-born soprano singer

See also